KTAG-TV, UHF analog channel 25, was a television station licensed to Lake Charles, Louisiana, United States. The station was owned by Charles W. Lamar of Baton Rouge and was Lake Charles' first television station.

History

Originally, the station was affiliated with CBS, ABC, and Dumont, but by 1957, it was solely a CBS affiliate, as Dumont folded and when KPLC-TV signed on in 1954, it took the ABC affiliation on a secondary basis.

With the sign-on of KPLC, KTAG was at a major disadvantage being a UHF station in a small market competing with a VHF. In 1955, the Charles W. Lamar estate petitioned the FCC for VHF channel 3 to move the station to that spot, but it was not granted, as Acadian Television Corporation of Lafayette also lobbied (and was eventually granted) for the channel.  By the early 1960s, KTAG operated only five hours a day with a staff of only three people, and on August 3, 1961, it signed off. In 1962, KATC signed on as the ABC affiliate for Lafayette (and, by extension, Lake Charles) on KTAG's desired channel 3. CBS would not return to Lake Charles until KSWL-LD signed on February 15, 2017; prior to this, Lafayette's KLFY-TV and Beaumont's KFDM served as the CBS affiliates for the area. It was not until the 1980s that another UHF station signed on to serve the Lake Charles area (KLTL-TV (channel 18), a satellite of Louisiana Public Broadcasting, signed on in 1981; and KVHP (channel 29), which is now a Fox affiliate, signed on in 1983).

References

Television channels and stations established in 1953
Television channels and stations disestablished in 1961
TAG-TV
1953 establishments in Louisiana
1961 disestablishments in Louisiana
Defunct television stations in the United States
Defunct mass media in Louisiana